In functional analysis, a Markushevich basis (sometimes M-basis) is a biorthogonal system that is both complete and total.

Definition 
Let   be Banach space.

In a separable space, biorthogonality is not a substantial obstruction to a Markuschevich basis; any spanning set and separating functionals can be made biorthogonal.

Examples 
Every Schauder basis of a Banach space is also a Markuschevich basis; the converse is not true in general.

The sequence space  admits no Markushevich basis, because it is both Grothendieck and irreflexive.  But any separable space (such as ) has dual (resp. ) complemented in a space admitting a Markushevich basis.

References 

Functional analysis